The Mihail Kogălniceanu-class river monitor is a class of riverine patrol boats in service with the Romanian Naval Forces. Three ships of this class are currently in service with the Romanian Navy.

Ships
 Mihail Kogălniceanu (F-45). Launched 1993 – in service.
 Ion C. Brătianu (F-46). Launched 1995 – in service.
 Lascăr Catargiu (F-47). Launched 1998 – in service

See also
Romanian Naval Forces

External links

World Navies Today

Monitor classes
Riverine warfare